Daniel Gimeno-Traver was the defending champion, but lost to Daniel Muñoz de la Nava in the first round.

Pablo Carreño won the title, defeating Taro Daniel 6–4, 6–1 in the final.

Seeds

Draw

Finals

Top half

Bottom half

References
 Main Draw
 Qualifying Draw

Copa Sevilla singles
Singles
2014 ATP Challenger Tour